Thaisella is a genus of sea snails, marine gastropod mollusks, in the family Muricidae, the murex snails or rock snails.

Species
Species within the genus Thaisella include:
 Thaisella callifera (Lamarck, 1822)
 Thaisella chocolata (Duclos, 1832)
 Thaisella coronata (Lamarck, 1816)
 Thaisella forbesii (Dunker, 1853)
 Thaisella guatemalteca Simone, 2017
 Thaisella kiosquiformis (Duclos, 1832)
 Thaisella mariae (Morretes, 1954)
 Thaisella trinitatensis (Guppy, 1869)
 Thaisella tumulosa (Reeve, 1846)

The following species were brought into synonymy:'''
 Thaisella blanfordi (Melvill, 1893): synonym of Indothais blanfordi (Melvill, 1893)
 Thaisella dubia (Schepman, 1919): synonym of Indothais dubia (Schepman, 1919)
 Thaisella gradata (Jonas, 1846): synonym of Indothais gradata (Jonas, 1846)
 Thaisella javanica (Philippi, 1848):  synonym of Indothais javanica (Philippi, 1848)
 Thaisella jubilaea (Tan & Sigurdsson, 1990): synonym of Reishia jubilaea (K. S. Tan & Sigurdsson, 1990) synonym of Reishia luteostoma (Holten, 1802) (superseded combination)
 Thaisella keluo (Tan & Liu, 2001): synonym of Reishia keluo (K.-S. Tan & L.-L. Liu, 2001)
 Thaisella lacera (Born, 1778): synonym of Indothais lacera (Born, 1778)
 Thaisella luteostoma (Holten, 1803): synonym of Reishia luteostoma (Holten, 1802)
 Thaisella malayensis (Tan & Sigurdsson, 1996): synonym of Indothais malayensis (K. S. Tan & Sigurdsson, 1996) (superseded combination)
 Thaisella mutabilis (Link, 1807): synonym of Indothais lacera (Born, 1778)
 Thaisella pinangensis (Tan & Sigurdsson, 1996): synonym of Indothais pinangensis (K. S. Tan & Sigurdsson, 1996)
 Thaisella rufotincta (Tan & Sigurdsson, 1996): synonym of Indothais pinangensis (K. S. Tan & Sigurdsson, 1996)
 Thaisella sacellum (Gmelin, 1791): synonym of Indothais sacellum (Gmelin, 1791)
 Thaisella tissoti (Petit de la Saussaye, 1852): synonym of Indothais sacellum (Gmelin, 1791)
 Thaisella wutingi (Tan, 1997): synonym of Indothais wutingi'' (K. S. Tan, 1997)

References

External links
 Clench W.J. (1947). The genera Purpura and Thais in the western Atlantic. Johnsonia. 2(23): 61-91

 
Gastropods described in 1947